"30 Minutes After Noon" is an episode of Thunderbirds, a British Supermarionation television series created by Gerry and Sylvia Anderson and filmed by their production company AP Films (APF) for ITC Entertainment. Written by Alan Fennell and directed by David Elliott, it was first broadcast on 11 November 1965 on ATV Midlands as the seventh episode of Series One. It is the 18th episode in the official running order.

Set in the 2060s, Thunderbirds follows the exploits of International Rescue, an organisation that uses technologically advanced rescue vehicles to save human life. The main characters are ex-astronaut Jeff Tracy, founder of International Rescue, and his five adult sons, who pilot the organisation's main vehicles: the Thunderbird machines. In "30 Minutes After Noon", International Rescue race to save a British secret agent caught up in the latest scheme of the Erdman Gang, a notorious criminal organisation.

Drawing inspiration from the spy film The Ipcress File, Elliott decided to realise Fennell's script through the use of what commentator Stephen La Rivière terms "quirky visuals". Elliott and camera operator Alan Perry experimented with original camera angles and movements, choosing to open one scene with a long tracking shot. The episode's incidental music is largely recycled from earlier APF productions.

Commentators including media historian Nicholas J. Cull have noted that Elliott and Perry's cinematography emulates the visual style of 1960s James Bond films. La Rivière, however, suggests that this visual homage is not evident throughout, arguing that the episode's first half uses more conventional filming techniques. "30 Minutes After Noon" was released as an audio play in 1967 and serialised as a comic strip in 1992.

Plot
While driving through Spoke City at night, government employee Thomas Prescott gives a lift to a seemingly innocent hitchhiker. The stranger's true intentions are revealed when he places an unbreakable metal bracelet around Prescott's wrist, telling him that it contains a powerful explosive charge that will detonate in 30 minutes and that the key to unlock it is in his office at the Hudson Building. Speeding alone to his place of work, Prescott unlocks the bracelet and leaves it in a filing cabinet. While he is taking a lift back down to the ground floor, the bracelet explodes, obliterating the building's top floors. The lift cables are severed and Prescott is plunged to the bottom of the lift shaft deep underground.

The fire is brought under control but Prescott is cut off. News of the disaster reaches International Rescue on Tracy Island. Jeff (voiced by Peter Dyneley) dispatches Scott (voiced by Shane Rimmer) to Spoke City in Thunderbird 1, followed by Virgil and Alan (voiced by David Holliday and Matt Zimmerman) in Thunderbird 2. At the scene, Virgil and Alan descend the lift shaft in International Rescue's new fire-fighting apparatus: a protective cage fitted with a metal claw. They clamp the damaged lift and raise it to ground level, where Prescott is arrested. Police Commissioner Garfield notes that classified documents about various criminal organisations, notably the Erdman Gang, were destroyed in the fire and that the Hudson Building's fire suppression systems had been sabotaged. When investigators find the remains of the bracelet, an intelligence operation is launched to expose the Erdman Gang.

Southern, a British Secret Service agent, is assigned to infiltrate the gang. After being initiated, he is sent to the deserted Glen Carrick Castle in Scotland to prepare for a mission, joined by gang members Dempsey and Kenyon. All three men have been fitted with bracelets identical to Prescott's. The gang leader radios them to deliver the briefing: they are to drive to the Nuclear Plutonium Store, which holds the isotopes for Britain's nuclear power stations, and destroy it with explosive charges timed to detonate at 12:30 p.m., causing a massive nuclear explosion that will devastate half of England. To ensure that the men carry out their task, the charges are in their bracelets and are already set; the key to unlock the bracelets is in the store's main vault.

Driving to the store, Southern, Dempsey and Kenyon bypass the security doors and use a ray gun to neutralise the store's robot guards. When they reach the vault, Southern holds Dempsey and Kenyon at gunpoint, ordering them to proceed to the scheduled rendezvous with the leader and capture him. The tables are turned, however, when a surviving robot sneaks up behind Southern and traps him with its powerful arms. Dempsey and Kenyon unlock the bracelets and leave them in the vault. They then set off for the rendezvous, jamming the security doors behind them to ensure that Southern dies in the nuclear explosion.

Southern transmits a distress call to his superior, Sir William Frazer, who in turn radios International Rescue for help. Flying to the store in Thunderbirds 1 and 2, Scott and Virgil use the Laser Cutter Vehicle to burn through the security doors. Reaching the vault with 5 minutes to go before the bracelets detonate Virgil deactivates the robot, releasing Southern. Meanwhile, Scott takes off in Thunderbird 1 with the bracelets and jettisons them over the sea, where they explode harmlessly in the water. Meanwhile, Lady Penelope and Parker (voiced by Sylvia Anderson and David Graham) intercept Dempsey, Kenyon and the gang leader in FAB 1 and use the car's gun to shoot down them down just as they are getting away in a helijet. Southern recovers from his ordeal at Creighton-Ward Mansion.

Production
Director David Elliott was unenthusiastic about realising Alan Fennell's script until he saw the spy thriller The Ipcress File. He remembered that the film "used all the old-fashioned shotslooking through a lampshade, etc. On Monday morning, Paddy [Seale, the lighting cameraman] came in and said, 'I saw a film this weekend,' and I said, 'So did I.' 'Was it The Ipcress File?' 'Yep. Right, that's what I want to do.'" In homage to the film, Elliott incorporated what commentator Stephen La Rivière terms "quirky visuals" into his direction of the episode.

The Glen Carrick Castle scene opens with a tracking shot covering all three walls of the puppet set, for which Elliott co-ordinated the camera movements with operator Alan Perry. In a pioneering move for a Supermarionation series, this scene also uses forced perspective to show a human hand and scale marionette puppets in the same shot: while the hand, intended to belong to Southern, twiddles a pen in the foreground, the puppets of Kenyon and Dempsey occupy the background. A visual illusion ensures that Kenyon and Dempsey appear correctly scaled in relation to the hand, even though Thunderbirds puppets were only  adult human size.

The miniature model representing Glen Carrick Castle was a re-use of the model of Castle McGregor from the Stingray episode "Loch Ness Monster". It later appeared as Glen Garry Castle in the Captain Scarlet and the Mysterons episode "The Trap".

Much of the episode's incidental music was originally composed for earlier APF series, particularly Stingray. Re-used tracks include the Highland theme from "Loch Ness Monster" and "March of the Oysters" from "Secret of the Giant Oyster", another episode of Stingray.

Reception
Sylvia Anderson noted Alan Fennell's "vivid imagination" and suggested that "30 Minutes After Noon" was "more a vehicle for live action than for the limited emotions of our puppet cast." According to Nathalie Olah of The Independent, the episode's plot highlights the "sense of drama" that made Thunderbirds popular: "Sure, most kids didn't understand the workings of a plutonium bomb, but the fact that the show was capable of sustaining their attention, as well as that of their older siblings and parents, meant they had some idea by the end of said episode."

Media historian Nicholas J. Cull links the episode to another of Fennell's Thunderbirds scripts, "The Man from MI.5", which features a British Secret Service agent called Bondson. For Cull, "30 Minutes After Noon" is one of several Thunderbirds episodes that includes visual homage to the James Bond films. In particular, he comments on Southern's briefing scene, in which the characters of Southern, Sir William Frazer and an unnamed aide are represented by hats on a hat-stand: "Southern's hat is a trilby, tossed onto the stand in best James Bond fashion." (Another of the hats – a bowler – belonged to Keith Shackleton, APF's head of merchandising.) Tom Fox of Starburst magazine also praises the "hatstand homage" and names the robot guards and the Scottish castle as the episode's other highlights. He gives "30 Minutes After Noon" a score of 4 out of 5.

Stephen La Rivière, author of Filmed in Supermarionation: A History of the Future, acknowledges Elliott's decision to use an original visual style but argues that the first half of the episode is "filmed as normal". La Rivière also comments on the editing, noting that the plot of the episode is effectively split into two parts (the explosion at the Hudson Building followed by Southern's infiltration of the Erdman Gang). He suggests that this makes "30 Minutes After Noon" similar to the earliest episodes of Thunderbirds, which were originally 25 minutes long and subsequently extended to 50 minutes through the addition of secondary rescues and character-based subplots.

A review in NTBS News Flash describes "30 Minutes After Noon" as a "thrilling, well-paced episode" that "brings together a very sadistic bad guy scheme and some innocent, and some not-so-innocent victims in peril". It describes the pacing as "especially good" and also praises the "inventive" camera work, noting, "I don't think I've seen more use of 'real hand acting' in any other episode." The review compares the exploding bracelets to the premise of the Saw films, in which people are trapped in dangerous situations and threatened with death if they refuse to carry out tasks placed before them.

Adaptations
In July 1967, Century 21 Records released an EP audio adaptation of "30 Minutes After Noon" narrated by David Graham as Parker.

In 1992, Fennell and Malcolm Stokes adapted the episode into a comic strip for issues 18 to 20 of Thunderbirds: The Comic. Later that year, the strip was re-published in the graphic album Thunderbirds in Action.

References

Works cited

External links

1965 British television episodes
Intelligence agencies in fiction
Television episodes about gangs
Television episodes set in England
Television episodes set in Scotland
Thunderbirds (TV series) episodes